John Barton (born 1957) is a Canadian poet.

Early life
Barton was born in Edmonton, Alberta, in 1957 but was raised in Calgary.

Education
Barton studied at the University of Alberta, University of Calgary, University of Quebec, Victoria University, and Columbia University in New York.

He originally wanted to study architecture but did poorly in calculus and was enrolled in English courses in the Faculté Saint-Jean at the University of Alberta. He became a poet upon realization that there were fewer factors affecting his ability to excel in his chosen vocation. In 1986, he graduated from the University of Western Ontario, with a Master of Library and Information Science. Also, Barton studied Book Editing at the Banff Publishing Centre in 1994.

Barton studied poetry with Eli Mandel, Gary Geddes, Robin Skelton, Joseph Brodsky, and Daniel Halpern.

Career
Barton has written ten books of poetry.

Since 1980 his poems have appeared in seventy-five magazines and thirty anthologies in North America, the United Kingdom, India, and Australia.

Barton was co-editor of Arc Poetry Magazine from 1990 to 2003. He edits The Malahat Review and was poetry editor for Winnipeg's Signature Editions from 2006 5 to 2008.  He co-founded the Poem of the Year Contest in 1996. He was writer-in-residence at the Saskatoon Public Library from September 2008 to May 2008. During the 2010/11 academic year, he was writer-in-residence at University of New Brunswick and in the fall 2015 term, at the Memorial University of Newfoundland. Additionally he worked as a librarian and editor for five museums in Ottawa between 1986 and 2003. He has lived in Victoria, British Columbia since 2004.

He and Billeh Nickerson co-edited the anthology Seminal: The Anthology of Canada’s Gay Male Poets, published in 2007 by Arsenal Pulp Press. In 2012 his Selected Poems were published by Nightwood.

Awards
 1986: Patricia Hackett Prize, University of Western Australia
 1988: Archibald Lampman Award, for West of Darkness: Emily Carr, a self-portrait
 1995: Archibald Lampman Award, for Designs from the Interior
 1995: Ottawa Book Award
 1999: Archibald Lampman Award, for Sweet Ellipsis
 2003: CBC Literary Award (Second Prize)
 2006: National Magazine Award (Silver)
 2019: Victoria's Poet Laureate

Works

Poetry
1981: A Poor Photographer. Sono Nis Press
 1984: Hidden Structure'. Ekstasis Editions
1987: West of Darkness: Emily Carr, a Self-Portrait. Penumbra Press
1993:  
1994: 
1998: 
1999: 
2001: 
2009: Hymn. Brick Books
2012: For the Boy with the Eyes of the Virgin: Selected Poems. Nightwood Editions
2014: Polari. Goose Lane Editions

Chapbooks
1995: Destinations, Leaving the Map, above/ground press
1999: Oxygen, above/ground press
1999: 
2003: 
2004 Asymmetries, Frog Hollow Press Book One: House of the Present; Book Two: The Strata.
2012: Balletomane: The Program Notes of Lincoln Kirstein. JackPine
2016: Reframing Paul Cadmus: Pictures from an Exhibition. above/ground press

Criticism
"Trends in Canadian Poetry", Educational Insights'', 11(1)

Editor

References

External links
Canadian Poets, University of Toronto
"John Barton - Interview", Literary Photographer, October 24, 2008 
Poet Laureate, City of Victoria

1957 births
Living people
20th-century Canadian poets
20th-century Canadian male writers
Canadian male poets
Writers from Edmonton
University of Western Ontario alumni
Canadian gay writers
Canadian LGBT poets
Canadian anthologists
University of Alberta alumni
University of Calgary alumni
University of Victoria alumni
Columbia University alumni
21st-century Canadian poets
21st-century Canadian male writers
Poets Laureate of places in Canada
Gay poets
21st-century Canadian LGBT people
20th-century Canadian LGBT people